Ash Flat is a city in Fulton and Sharp counties in the U.S. state of Arkansas.  The population was 1,137 at the 2020 census. The city is the county seat of Sharp County.

History
Ash Flat was established in 1856. The community was so named for a grove of ash trees near the original town site.
 
In 1967, the Arkansas General Assembly designated Ash Flat as the single county seat of Sharp County, a title previously held by Hardy and Evening Shade concurrently.

Geography
Ash Flat is located at  (36.231107, -91.609163).

Demographics

2020 census

As of the 2020 United States census, there were 1,137 people, 471 households, and 248 families residing in the city.

2010 census
As of the 2010 United States Census, there were 1,082 people living in the city. The racial makeup of the city was 96.8% White, 0.5% Black, 0.5% Native American and 1.5% from two or more races. 0.8% were Hispanic or Latino of any race.

2000 census
As of the census of 2000, there were 977 people, 430 households, and 233 families living in the city. The racial makeup of the city was 98.57% White, 0.41% Black or African American, 0.20% Native American, and 0.82% from two or more races.  0.72% of the population were Hispanic or Latino of any race.

There were 430 households, out of which 24.0% had children under the age of 18 living with them, 42.1% were married couples living together, 10.5% had a female householder with no husband present, and 45.8% were non-families. 41.4% of all households were made up of individuals, and 27.7% had someone living alone who was 65 years of age or older.  The average household size was 2.09 and the average family size was 2.91.

In the city, the population was spread out, with 21.6% under the age of 18, 5.7% from 18 to 24, 20.5% from 25 to 44, 20.6% from 45 to 64, and 31.6% who were 65 years of age or older.  The median age was 47 years. For every 100 females, there were 72.9 males.  For every 100 females age 18 and over, there were 70.6 males.

The median income for a household in the city was $16,797, and the median income for a family was $22,019. Males had a median income of $24,815 versus $15,556 for females. The per capita income for the city was $11,506.  About 24.5% of families and 31.7% of the population were below the poverty line, including 42.2% of those under age 18 and 22.6% of those age 65 or over.

Notable people
Gordon Carpenter, Olympic gold medalist in basketball
Preacher Roe, major league baseball player

Education
Ash Flat is served by the Highland School District, which operates Highland High School. The Highland district was formed from the 1962 consolidation of the Ash Flat School District and the Hardy School District. Due to the previous rivalry between the two districts, some members of the community were unsure whether the vote to consolidate would succeed.

Ozarka College established a site in Ash Flat in the fall of 2001.

References

External links
 City of Ash Flat official website
 Regional information
 Ash Flat at Arkansas.com
 http://www.ashflatfire.org/

Cities in Arkansas
Cities in Sharp County, Arkansas
County seats in Arkansas
Cities in Fulton County, Arkansas
Populated places established in 1856
1856 establishments in Arkansas